"Work Hard, Play Hard" is a song by American rapper Wiz Khalifa.

Work hard, play hard may also refer to:

 "Work Hard, Play Hard" (Tiësto song), a single by Dutch DJ Tiësto
 , a documentary film by German film director Carmen Losmann
 "Work hard play hard", the figurative English translation of the motto of the Camborne School of Mines (Laboris gloria Ludi)

 "Work Hard, Play Hard", an episode of the 2017 TV series One Day at a Time

See also 
 "Work Hard, Play Harder", a 2009 song co-written and recorded by American country artist Gretchen Wilson
 "Play Hard", a song by French DJ and record producer David Guetta